Märja is a small borough, formerly in Tähtvere Parish, now in Tartu, Tartu County in eastern Estonia.

References

Boroughs and small boroughs in Estonia
Populated places in Tartu County